Angelo Carlo Chendi (10 July 1933 – 12 September 2021) was an Italian cartoonist.

Since 1952, Carlo Chendi wrote hundreds of stories with characters from Disney comics.

Early life 
Chendi moved at a young age from Ferrara, to Rapallo, in Liguria, where he started his career as a cartoonist.

Career 
Chendi became one of the pillars of the so-called school of Rapallo, along with Maestro Luciano Bottaro and his friend Giorgio Rebuffi, with whom he founded in 1968 the group Bierrecì (acronym of Bottaro, Rebuffi, Chendi) without, however, stop working with the Mondadori in the realization of Disney stories.

His career took place between the area of Tigullio and Milan, where he participated in, among other things, the creation of the magazine King of Spades, the first of Studio Bierrecì, and implementation of traditional Italian of Great Disney Feature his series was one of his most famous and appreciated, in collaboration with Luciano Bottaro. With Bottaro he began the great saga of Rebo, the tyrant of Saturn.

He died on September 12, 2021, at the age of 88.

Recognition 
In 1996, Chendi received the Yellow Kid as the best author.

In 1994, he won the prize Cover Silver from the Walt Disney Company.

In 2001, he won the prize UGiancu for best screenwriter.

Important Disney inventions include extraterrestrial duck O.K. Quack and detective Umperio Bogarto (both designed by Giorgio Cavazzano), the secret identity of Donald Duck "agent QQ7" (the story Mission Bob Fingher had acclaim Disney Americana), and the duet between Pippo and Witch Hazel.

In 2010, he won the Prix Papersera award.

References

External links
 Carlo Chendi Inducks

1933 births
2021 deaths
Italian cartoonists
Disney comics artists
Italian comics writers
People from the Province of Ferrara